The LaBiche Aerospace FSC-1, a.k.a. LaBiche 460sc, is a prototype roadable aircraft and is an example of a practical flying car capable of utilizing today's automotive and aviation infrastructure to provide true "door-to-door" travel.

Design and development
The FSC-1 can be parked in any garage or parking space available for cars and is the first known vehicle capable of automatic conversion from aircraft to car at the touch of a button. LaBiche has flown a 1/10 scale model, tested a 1/4 scale model and is now testing the FSC-1 prototype #1 (as of Oct 2007). Currently, the FSC-1 requires a pilot and driver's license to operate. However, upon approval from the FAA, development is underway for utilizing a new satellite navigation "hands free" flight system to travel from airport to airport that will eliminate the need for a pilot's license. Numerous safety systems and fail safes are also employed on the FSC-1, such as a recovery parachute.

The "Flying Sports Car-1" FSC-1, developed and marketed by LaBiche Aerospace under the name FSC-1, is a 5-seat, single engine, integrated style flying car. The LaBiche FSC-1 was introduced as a roadable aircraft (flying car) to fulfill the needs of a personal vehicle that is capable of "true" high-speed, "door-to-door" travel, utilizing current automotive and aviation infrastructure.

History
Development of the FSC-1 began in the late 1980s after Mitchell LaBiche, founder of LaBiche Aerospace, while on a typical cross-country trip in a light aircraft, became stranded for several days because of foul weather, when the weather was clear only 60 miles away yet there was no way to move the aircraft to the clear weather. This painful challenge stirred the designer to come up with a modern, flexible, and practical vehicle capable of true "door-to-door" travel.

The idea of flying cars (or roadable aircraft) had long been known. However, initial work centered on VTOL vehicles. After several years of research, market analysis, and customer surveys, the requirements for the FSC-1 were developed.

Model history

 2002 – First introduced
 2007 – Initial market sales

Today 
LaBiche Aerospace is now testing the full-scale prototype #1 (as of Oct 2007). The vehicle is now on sale. However, the latest news on the LaBiche website is from December, 2010.

Update: LaBiche website links to 2014's news article. The Kickstarter had only $12176 pledged out of its funding goal of $250000, and thus the project was not successful on August 28, 2014.

Specifications LaBiche FSC-1

References

External links
 LaBiche Aerospace-Official FSC-1 website

Roadable aircraft
2000s United States experimental aircraft